Izzy's Quest for the Olympic Rings is a mid-1990s video game developed by Alexandria and published by U.S. Gold for the Sega Genesis in 1995, and for the Super Nintendo Entertainment System in 1996.

Game
Izzy's Quest for the Olympic Rings is a game in which the player controls Izzy, the mascot of the Atlanta 1996 Summer Olympics. The game was released in 1995 by U.S. Gold for the Super NES and Genesis platforms.

Reception
Next Generation reviewed the Genesis version of the game, rating it two stars out of five, and stated that "you have another side-scrolling action game that leaves a bad taste in your mouth." Game Informer gave an overall score of 5.75 out of 10 noting the game geared for younger players, the gameplay being too easy and noting that the game does not offer anything new or innovative although the game being well designed for an action platformer concluding “it captures the quality of Sonic the Hedgehog and promises the wholesomeness and entertainment of the Olympic Games themselves.”

Reviews
GamePro (May, 1995) - SNES version
GamePro - Apr, 1995
Video Games & Computer Entertainment - Aug, 1995
Total! - Feb, 1996
Game Players - May, 1995

References

1995 video games
1996 Summer Olympics
Cancelled Sega 32X games
Platform games
Sega Genesis games
Summer Olympic video games
Super Nintendo Entertainment System games
U.S. Gold games
Video games about extraterrestrial life
Video games developed in the United States